Paul Barden (born August 29, 1936) is an American politician who served as a member of the King County Council from 1974 to 1994. A member of the Republican Party, he represented the 7th district.

References 

Living people
King County Councillors
Republican Party members of the Washington House of Representatives
1936 births